Victoria Hughes (née Rogers, 22 June 1897 – 30 August 1978) was a British lavatory attendant, and the first of her profession to have an entry in the Oxford Dictionary of National Biography, having published her memoirs Ladies' Mile (1977) at the age of 80, which some found shocking but which have since become a valuable local history resource.

Early life
Victoria Hughes was born Victoria Rogers on 22 June 1897 at Woodbury Lane, off Blackboy Hill, Bristol.  She was the fifth of ten children of Alfred William Rogers, a scaffolder, and his wife, Ellen Rogers.

On 16 July 1916, she married Richard Hughes (1896–1965), an apprentice ironmonger, who the same day left to fight in France as a member of the Royal Berkshire Regiment during the First World War. He was present at the Battle of the Somme. They had two daughters together, Margaret (born 1920) and Barbara (born 1931).

Career
Hughes' husband returned from the war with "trench foot, a limp, and failing eyesight".  She became the family's main breadwinner.

From 1929, until her retirement in May 1962, Hughes worked as what she described as a "loo lady" at a public toilet in Stoke Road on Bristol's Durdham Down. She soon discovered that many of her customers were prostitutes working the nearby Ladies Mile, and although thoroughly respectable herself, she did not judge, instead providing tea, sympathy and advice. She also kept notebooks about her working life.

In 1977, aged 80, Hughes published her memoirs as Ladies' Mile. The book "shocked some at the time, but since has become a valued source of local history".

Later life
From 1958, Mr and Mrs Hughes lived in a terraced house at 255 Gloucester Road, Bishopston, Bristol, where she died on 30 August 1978, from cancer. In 2003, a blue plaque was unveiled on the public conveniences where she worked, and in 2006 she became the first of her profession to be given an entry in the Oxford Dictionary of National Biography.

References

1897 births
1978 deaths
20th-century English memoirists
20th-century English women writers
Writers from Bristol
Deaths from cancer in England
British women memoirists
Restroom attendants